Charles "Charlie" Nicholas Kimber (born July 1957) is the National Secretary of the Socialist Workers Party of the United Kingdom from January 2011.

Kimber has been politically active since the 1970s and went on his first protest march in 1975. He is the editor of Socialist Worker newspaper and has also written for International Socialism, the SWP's journal of socialist theory. He is a director of Sherborne Publications Limited, the company that publishes the Socialist Worker, having taken that position following the resignation of Martin Smith as a director on 24 May 2013.

Selected publications
The struggle for workers power. Socialist Workers Party, 1998. 
Arbeidersmacht en socialisme. Amsterdam: Internationale Socialisten, 1998. 
Wales, class struggle and socialism. London: Bookmarks Publications, 1999. 
Pensions, profits and resistance. Socialist Workers Party, 2005. 
Immigration: the myths spread to divide us. Socialist Workers Party, 2010. 
Pay cuts, recession and resistance. Socialist Workers Party. 
Arguments for revolution: The case for the Socialist Workers Party. Socialist Workers Party, 2011. (With Joseph Choonara) 
Jeremy Corbyn Labour and the fight for socialism. Socialist Workers Party, 2015.

References

External links

1957 births
Living people
British political journalists
Socialist Workers Party (UK) members